Frederick Lucas (1812–1855) was a British journalist.

Frederick Lucas may also refer to:
Buddy Lucas (swimmer) (Frederick Ross Lucas, 1931–2002), New Zealand swimmer
Fred Lucas (Frederick Warrington Lucas, 1903–1987), American Major League Baseball player
Sir Frederick Cook, 2nd Baronet (Frederick Lucas Cook, 1844–1920), British politician
Frederic Augustus Lucas (1852–1929), American anatomist and museum director
Frederick Lucas (Sussex cricketer) (1860–1887), English cricketer
Fred Lucas (footballer) (Frederick Charles Lucas, 1933–2015), English footballer and cricketer for Kent
Frederick John Lucas (1915–1993), New Zealand aviator, farmer and tourist operator
Fred Lucas (rugby union) (Frederick William Lucas, 1902–1957), New Zealand rugby union player